Kyjov may refer to places:

Czech Republic
Kyjov, a town in the South Moravian Region
Kyjov Hills, part of the Carpathian Mountains
Kyjov (Žďár nad Sázavou District), a municipality and village in the Vysočina Region
Kyjov (Havlíčkův Brod District), a municipality and village in the Vysočina Region

Slovakia
Kyjov, Stará Ľubovňa District, a village in the Prešov Region